David C. Houle was born in 1953 in Dugway, Utah. Houle is the winningest high school coach in the United States, with over 1,000 victories in girls' basketball, track and cross-country, winning 68 state championships and 7 national championships. 

Houle began coaching in 1965, aged 12, and is a member of the National High School Coaches Association Hall of Fame. Houle amassed more state championships than any other high school coach, and was named by USA Today as "The Most Successful High School Coach in America".

He helped Mountain View High School (Utah)'s athletes, in boys' and girls' track and cross-country, and girls' basketball, earn 68 state championships, as well as numerous region trophies. After winning the boys' cross-country national title in 2002, he was named the Coach of the Year. His athletes were known for their love and support towards their opponents, and for years of service to the Orem City community. 

Houle resigned in 2006 after allegations of inappropriate conduct while on a road trip with his basketball team. Houle is reported to have allowed two girls, who had allegedly been sick, to sleep in his room while he walked in the lobby of the hotel all night to keep them away from the rest of the team.  Several rules were violated in allowing the members of his team to use his hotel room.  Despite being aggressively recruited by other schools throughout his coaching reign, Houle opted to stick to what he loved best and later worked at a nearby private school.

In his final days of coaching, Houle said, "I'm 52, and I hope to die at 92, so I have 40 good years left of coaching."

Houle currently lives in American Fork, Utah.

Southern Utah University

Coached junior varsity basketball from 1976-77 at Southern Utah University

Milford High School

Coached high school football from 1977 to 78

Carbon High School

Coached football and basketball from 1978 to 79

College of Eastern Utah

Coached football from 1978 to 79

Mountain View High School

Through his years coaching at Mountain View High School (Utah) 1980-2006, the program gained a national reputation for their athletics. With national championships in boys' cross-country (3), girls' cross-country (3), an ESPN National Championship in girls' basketball (1) in 2001, and numerous national records broken, the school has become a well-recognized name throughout the country.

Utah Valley University

Assistant track coach 2007-09 Utah Valley University

Kennesaw State University

Assistant men's basketball coach 2010-11

Awards

Dale Rex Dale Rex Award

References

External links
Daily Herald Article about Kennesaw State
2002 Coach of the Year
Coach Houle's Official Website

1953 births
Living people
People from Tooele County, Utah
High school basketball coaches in the United States
American track and field coaches